Sitka Jazz Festival is a three-day jazz festival in the community of Sitka, Alaska that takes place every February. It features educational clinics for participating students, evening concerts featuring professional jazz artists, and the All-Alaska Jazz Band—an audition-entrance honor ensemble for Alaskan high school students.

History
The Sitka Jazz Festival was born out of Sitka High School's "jazz nights." The jazz nights have occurred since 1995 and consisted of SHS ensembles and a guest professional artist playing solo and with SHS ensembles. Jazz Nights brought distinguished artists such as trumpeter Claudio Roditi and saxophonist Andres Boiarsky. The festival eventually expanded to accommodate multiple guest artists, clinics, out-of-town school jazz ensembles, and the venue was moved to the 1,500-seat Mt. Edgecumbe High School fieldhouse. The 2005 festival was housed in Sheldon Jackson College's Hames Center and in 2006 and 2007 the festival moved back to the Sitka High School gymnasium which, through an extensive overhaul, was turned into a temporary 500-seat auditorium. The 2009 festival took place in Sitka's auditorium, designed for a 619-seat capacity. The Sitka Jazz Festival is modeled after the Lionel Hampton Jazz Festival in Moscow, Idaho.

All-Alaska Jazz Band
The All-Alaska Jazz Band is independent from Alaska School Activities Association, but is the only honor jazz band in the state. It has featured students from as far north as Fairbanks and as far south as Ketchikan. Past guest directors include John Clayton, Bill Watrous, and Terell Stafford.

Notable festival musicians

 John Clayton
 Freddy Cole quartet
 Paquito D'Rivera
 Roberta Gamberini
 Ingrid Jensen
 Kristin Korb
 Mansound
 Claudio Roditi
 Lembit Saarsalu
 John Santos
 Terell Stafford
 Steve Turre
 Leonid Vintskevich
 Bill Watrous
 Alon Yavnai
Tom Scott
Barbara Morrison
Carmen Bradford
Eric Marienthal
Alan Ferber
Kenny Washington
Sullivan Fortner
Darren English
Ira Nepus
Jeff Hamilton
Mads Tolling

See also
 List of jazz festivals

External links
 

1995 establishments in Alaska
Annual events in Alaska
February events
Music festivals in Alaska
Jazz festivals in the United States
Music festivals established in 1995
Tourist attractions in Sitka, Alaska